8 was a streetcar line in Los Angeles, California. It was operated by the Los Angeles Railway from 1932 to 1955.

History
In 1932 the M line was split up into several distinct services — the Moneta Avenue branch became the basis of the new 8 line. The new service ran from Spring Street and Temple Street outbound to Manchester Avenue and South Broadway.

In 1934 the line was rerouted, integrating part of the former 9. The line ran from Spring and Temple Streets to 54th Street and Crenshaw Boulevard, by way of Spring Street, Main Street, Broadway Place, Broadway, and 54th Street. Off-peak service to Los Angeles Union Station began in August 1943. Starting in 1946 the line absorbed part of the former N to Union Station, enabling full time service for the line.

Tracks at Union station were transferred to the F line in 1949, with the 8 taking up former F trackage to Mission Road and Selig Place. Streetcar service ended on May 22, 1955.

Sources

External links
 8 Line Archives — Pacific Electric Railway Historical Society
 

Los Angeles Railway routes
Railway lines opened in 1932
Railway lines closed in 1955
1932 establishments in California
1956 disestablishments in California